Along Came Youth is a 1930 American pre-Code comedy film directed by Lloyd Corrigan and Norman Z. McLeod and written by George Marion, Jr., Maurice Bedel and Marion Dix. The film stars Charles "Buddy" Rogers, Frances Dee, Stuart Erwin, William Austin, Leo White and Betty Boyd. The film was released on December 20, 1930, by Paramount Pictures.

Cast
Charles "Buddy" Rogers as Larry Brooks
Frances Dee as Elinor Farrington
Stuart Erwin as Ambrose
William Austin as Eustace
Evelyn Hall as Lady Prunella
Leo White as Senor Cortés
Betty Boyd as Sue Long
Arthur Hoyt as Adkins
Sybil Grove as Maid
Herbert Sherwood as Doorman
Charles West as Chauffeur
Macon Jones as Neetsfoot Boy
Billy Wheaton as Neetsfoot Boy 
George Ernest as Neetsfoot Boy
Gordon Thorpe as Neetsfoot Boy
John Strauss as Neetsfoot Boy

References

External links
 

1930 films
1930s English-language films
American comedy films
1930 comedy films
Paramount Pictures films
Films directed by Lloyd Corrigan
Films directed by Norman Z. McLeod
American black-and-white films
Films scored by Karl Hajos
1930s American films